Salvia elegans, a species with several varieties including pineapple sage and tangerine sage, is a perennial shrub native to Mexico.

Description
Salvia elegans Pineapple Sage has tubular red flowers and an attractive scent to the leaves that is similar to pineapple. It produces numerous erect leafy stems up to 150 cm and flowers in the late autumn. The red flowers are attractive to hummingbirds and butterflies. In a highland temperate forest in central Mexico, pineapple sage was found to be one of the three most-visited species by hummingbirds.
It is a short-day plant. The flowering season in Mexico is August onward; further north it may not flower till later autumn, and if there is no frost, it may flower until Spring.

The variety "Honey Melon", which has the same pineapple fragrance in the leaves, blooms early in the summer, rather than in autumn.

Salvia Elegans Tangerine Sage grows to about 60 cm - 90 cm tall, has bronze edged leaves and a citrus scent. It is summer flowering.

Cultivation
The pale yellow-green leaves are veined, and covered with fine hairs. Six to twelve scarlet flowers grow in whorls, with a long inflorescence that blooms gradually and over a prolonged period of time. With a hard frost, the plant will die down to the ground and grow back the following spring. Pineapple sage was introduced into horticulture about 1870.

Phytochemistry
The essential oil of S. elegans consists primarily of caffeic acid and its derivatives, such as rosmarinic acid and salvianolic acid, and flavones.

Uses
The leaves and flowers of S. elegans are edible. The plant is used in Mexican traditional medicine, especially for anxiety and hypertension.

References

External links

 
 S. elegans from Floridata

elegans
Plants described in 1804
Flora of Mexico
Taxa named by Martin Vahl